Lori Voornas is part of the morning show, The Q Morning Show with Lori, Jeff and Brittany on 97.9 WJBQ radio in Portland, Maine. Her birthday is September 12, 1965. She was born in Evanston, Illinois.

References

American radio personalities
Living people
Year of birth missing (living people)
People from Evanston, Illinois